USS Katie (SP-660) was a United States Navy patrol vessel in commission from 1917 to 1918.

Construction and acquisition
Katie was built as a civilian motorboat of the same name by C. E. Bush at Crittenden, Virginia, in 1915 or 1916. In 1917, the U.S. Navy chartered her from her owner, the Virginia Fish and Oyster Commission, for use as a section patrol boat during World War I. She was commissioned as USS Katie (SP-660) on 24 April 1917, although the Navy did not take delivery of her until 18 May 1917, at Norfolk, Virginia.

U.S. Navy service
Assigned to the 5th Naval District and based at Crittenden, Katie operated as a shore and section patrol boat until less than three weeks before the end of World War I. Her patrols extended from Norfolk and the James River to the lower reaches of the Potomac River and the Chesapeake Bay.

Katie, now under command of Boatswain O. W. Hudson, was decommissioned on 22 October 1918 and was returned to the Virginia Fish and Oyster Commission the same day.

Later career
Katie served the Virginia Fish and Oyster Commission until she was sold to the Redmond Lumber Corporation in 1956. She had two more owners before 1963, when William C. Poole purchased her. Poole used her both as a private yacht and as a United States Coast Guard Auxiliary operational facility.

In 2000, Katie was sold to William Stratton, then on 18 September 2001 to Leslie Porter. He performed restoration work on her and moved her to Belhaven, North Carolina.

In October 2003, William Patterson purchased Katie. He moved her to Richmond, Virginia, and made plans to take her to wooden boat shows on the Chesapeake Bay. She remains extant.

After years left docked in Richmond, VA the “Katie” sustained many damages, including a fire and multiple sinking s. Despite that she has persevered and was acquired by a small collective of friends. Katy Best, Caitlin Shiflett, Nathan Conway and Joshua Dziegiel are in the process of restoring “Katie” to her former glory. She is still water worthy and takes many pleasure trips up and down the James River even participating in the 2021 Christmas Parade. She has an Instagram account as well, This Old Boat.

Notes

References

SP-660 Katie at Department of the Navy Naval History and Heritage Command Online Library of Selected Images: U.S. Navy Ships -- Listed by Hull Number "SP" #s and "ID" #s -- World War I Era Patrol Vessels and other Acquired Ships and Craft numbered from SP-600 through SP-699
NavSource Online: Section Patrol Craft Photo Archive Katie (SP 660)

Patrol vessels of the United States Navy
World War I patrol vessels of the United States
Ships built in Norfolk, Virginia
1915 ships
1916 ships
Individual yachts